The Bardo National Museum of Prehistory and Ethnography (El-mathaf El-ouatani Bardo) is a national museum located in Algiers, Algeria.

The edifice is a former Moorish villa. It was opened as a museum in 1927.

Nothing specific is known about this residence, formerly in the countryside and now encompassed in the modern city. H. Klein tells us that the palace was built in the eighteenth century and that it would have been the property of Prince Omar before the French conquest. A document, in the form of a drawing signed by Captain Longuemare, specifies that it was Mustapha ben Omar who was a very rich Tunisian. In 1926, the Bardo Palace was ceded to the Domains by Mrs Frémont, sister and heiress of Pierre Joret.

See also 
 List of museums in Algeria

References

External links 

 Bardo National Museum (Archive) 
 https://web.archive.org/web/20130721142135/http://lebardo.info/
 Images of Bardo National Museum in Manar al-Athar digital photo archive

Museums in Algiers
Ethnographic museums in Africa
1927 establishments in Algeria
Moorish architecture
Museums established in 1927
Archaeological museums in Algeria